Chenopodium formosanum is a Chenopodium species native to Taiwan. It was a key component of the diets of Taiwanese indigenous peoples and remains culturally and culinarily significant.

Common names
Chenopodium formosanum is known in the Paiwan language as djulis. In Chinese it is known as 紅藜 (simplified 红藜, literally "red goosefoot", Mandarin hónglí). It is also known as red quinoa. Note that the name "red goosefoot" is also used for the related species Oxybasis rubra.

Description
Chenopodium formosanum is a cereal. It has a high fiber and protein content.

History
Chenopodium formosanum was a key component of the diets of  Formosan indigenous peoples, but  it had largely disappeared from cultivation by the 2000s. Renewed interest in traditional foodstuffs has led to a revival of production with cultivation in Taitung County expanding from 40 hectares in 2015 to 200 hectares in 2018. This rapid expansion quickly gutted the market and surplus produce had to be stored.

Chenopodium formosanum is part of the Slow Food Foundation for Biodiversity's Ark of Taste.

See also
 Quinoa

References

formosanum
Taiwanese cuisine
Flora of Taiwan